The Sumatran chocolate tiger (Parantica tityoides) is a species of nymphalid butterfly in the Danainae subfamily. It is endemic to Indonesia.

References

Parantica
Butterflies of Indonesia
Endemic fauna of Indonesia
Taxonomy articles created by Polbot
Butterflies described in 1890